Ding et Dong was a Canadian comedy duo from Quebec, consisting of Serge Thériault as "Ding" and Claude Meunier as "Dong". They are most noted for their eponymous 1990 comedy film, which was based on their prior stage show.

In the film, Ding and Dong are aspiring comedians, who begin performing door-to-door comedy shows but find their collaboration threatened when a wealthy dying man names them as the heirs in his will, leaving them $30 million toward the creation of their own theatre company and thus sparking creative disagreements between the two as to their future direction. The film's cast also includes Raymond Bouchard, Jean Lapointe, Yves Pelletier, Linda Sorgini and Anne Dorval.

At the 12th Genie Awards, the film won the Golden Reel Award as the top-grossing Canadian film of the year.

References

External links
 

1990 films
1990 comedy films
Canadian comedy films
Quebec films
Films set in Montreal
Films shot in Montreal
French-language Canadian films
1990s Canadian films